, is Bandai's robot toy line-up diverse from the popular Soul of Chogokin franchise, first introduced in August 2010. Despite being under the Soul of Chogokin family, the major difference is the size - only scaling around 14cm. Aside from the size, the other main selling points for the line-up are the flexible articulation of the robots and added weapons set(s) (sold separately) to evoke some of the effects, memorable moves, and attacks seen in each of the robots' respective series. This toy line is mainly focused on the Super Robot series as well as the Super Sentai and Armored Core series. Just like the Soul of Chogokin, the robot figures are molded in plastic and diecast metal. Extra accessories such as bases and laboratory (such as Mazinger Z's lab) are also in the works. Super Robot Chogokin is targeted to a mature demographic, but priced lower than the Soul of Chogokin line.

Line-Up

Accessories

Weapons and accessories to invoke some of the moves and attacks seen in the series

Tamashii Japanese Web Store Exclusive

Tamashii Nation Event & Festival Event (aka - FES) Exclusive

Exclusive Mail Order Items

Super Effect Campaign

This is basically a special effect part(s) for each individual mechas, but can be used with others.

See also
 Soul of Chogokin
 Super Imaginative Chogokin
 Chogokin
 Godaikin

External links
  (Japanese)

Action figures
Bandai brands
Japanese die-cast toys
2010s toys
Toy mecha